Marco Bortolotti and Cristian Rodríguez were the defending champions but chose not to defend their title.

Evgeny Karlovskiy and Evgenii Tiurnev won the title after defeating Ben McLachlan and Szymon Walków 6–3, 6–4 in the final.

Seeds

Draw

References

External links
 Main draw

Open Città della Disfida - Doubles
2022 Doubles